Believe is the fifth studio album and first Christmas album by Contemporary Christian music singer by Natalie Grant. It was released on October 25, 2005, through Curb Records.

Critical reception

Johnny Loftus of AllMusic said "Natalie Grant follows her Dove Award-nominated work on Awaken with a Christmas album called Believe. Her opening rendition of 'O Come, All Ye Faithful' harks back to Grant's days a gospel singer, while 'Let It Snow! Let It Snow! Let It Snow' is lighter and happier (as would be appropriate for such a joyously repetitive song title), Grant's vocal dancing across a jazzy arrangement fluffed up with brass. Her take on 'Santa Claus Is Coming to Town' is similarly bold. But besides these pleasant reads of the season's standards, Grant and producer Bernie Herms also explore some original material and expansive arrangements. A breathy 'Silver Bells' medleys into an epic 'O Holy Night', while the collection's title track is a Grant original that uses the story of the birth of Jesus as a basis for her faith and inspiration." Cross Rhythmss Nigel Harris stated "Christmas albums can too easily slide into slushy sentimentality or banal, unimaginative rehashing of secular Christmas favorites. Natalie Grant dips more than a toe into both in this reissue of her 2005 Christmas release, which when originally released charted at number 13 on Billboard Top Heatseekers chart. 'O Come All Ye Faithful' and 'O Little Town of Bethlehem' showcase Natalie's voice without breaking much new ground. Sadly, 'Let It Snow' and 'Santa Claus Is Coming To Town' sound like the sort of music you hear in supermarkets in December. However the title track lifts the whole album and earns it a good three squares more than most of the rest of the album deserves. With vocals reminiscent of Celine Dion at times Natalie soars and swoops though one of the best new Christmas songs I have heard in years. 'What Christmas Means To Me' is an over-the-top Motown pastiche, but the final tracks, especially the medley 'Silver Bells/Savior Came For Me/O Holy Night' again lift the standard. If you're looking for something new next Christmas, don't dismiss this album for its weaker tracks; the stronger ones more than compensate."

Track listing

Charts

Release history

Awards
Believe was nominated for Inspirational Album of the Year at the 37th GMA Dove Awards.

References

2005 albums
2005 Christmas albums
Christmas albums by American artists
Curb Records albums
Natalie Grant albums